Ziba may refer to:
Ziba (biblical figure)
Ziba, Lorestan, a village in Iran
Ziba (gastropod)
Ziba Shirazi
Ziba Design, a Portland, Oregon-based design firm founded by Sohrab Vossoughi in 1984